C. L. Wrenn may refer to:
Charles Leslie Wrenn (1895–1969), British scholar
Corey Lee Wrenn (born 1983), American sociologist